The West Point Story may refer to:
 The West Point Story (film), a 1950 musical film directed by Roy Del Ruth and starring James Cagney
 The West Point Story (TV series), a 1956–58 television drama series about the United States Military Academy